LY or ly may refer to:

Government and politics 
 Libya (ISO 3166-1 country code LY)
 Lý dynasty, a Vietnamese dynasty
 Labour Youth of Ireland
 Legislative Yuan, the unicameral legislature of the Republic of China (Taiwan)

Science and technology 
 .ly, the Top-level domain for Libya
 .ly, the default filetype extension of the GNU LilyPond sheet music format
 Light-year, the distance that light travels in one year in a vacuum 
 Langley (unit), a unit of energy distribution over a given area

Other uses 
 Lý (Vietnamese surname), a Vietnamese surname 
 Ly the Fairy, a character from Rayman 2: The Great Escape
 -ly, an adjectival and adverbial suffix in English
 Hungarian ly, or elipszilon, a digraph in the Hungarian alphabet
 El Al (IATA airline designator LY)

See also

 
 Light year (disambiguation)
 YL (disambiguation)